The 1972 VIII FIBA International Christmas Tournament "Trofeo Raimundo Saporta" was the 8th edition of the FIBA International Christmas Tournament. It took place at Sports City of Real Madrid Pavilion, Madrid, Spain, on 24, 25 and 26 December 1972 with the participations of Real Madrid (champions of the 1971–72 Liga Española de Baloncesto), Palmeiras, Virginia Cavaliers and Estudiantes Monteverde.

League stage

Day 1, December 24, 1972

|}

Day 2, December 25, 1972

|}

Day 3, December 26, 1972

|}

Final standings

References

1972–73 in European basketball
1972–73 in Spanish basketball